Redlane Hundred or Redland Hundred was a hundred in the county of Dorset, England, containing the following parishes:

Buckhorn Weston
Child Okeford
East Stour
Fifehead Magdalen
Hanford (from 1858)
Iwerne Courtney
Kington Magna
Manston
Silton
Sutton Waldron
Todber
West Stour

See also
List of hundreds in Dorset

Sources
Boswell, Edward, 1833: The Civil Division of the County of Dorset (published on CD by Archive CD Books Ltd, 1992)
Hutchins, John, History of Dorset, vols 1-4 (3rd ed 1861–70; reprinted by EP Publishing, Wakefield, 1973)
Mills, A. D., 1977, 1980, 1989: Place Names of Dorset, parts 1–3. English Place Name Society: Survey of English Place Names vols LII, LIII and 59/60

Hundreds of Dorset